The Max Planck Institute for Chemistry (Otto Hahn Institute) is a non-university research institute under the auspices of the Max Planck Society (German: Max-Planck-Gesellschaft) in Mainz, Germany. It was created as the Kaiser Wilhelm Institute for Chemistry in 1911 in Berlin.

In 2016 research at the Max Planck Institute for Chemistry in Mainz aims at an integral understanding of chemical processes in the Earth system, particularly in the atmosphere and biosphere. Investigations address a wide range of interactions between air, water, soil, life and climate in the course of Earth history up to today's human-driven epoch, the Anthropocene. The institute consists of five scientific departments (Atmospheric Chemistry, Climate Geochemistry, Biogeochemistry, Multiphase Chemistry, and Particle Chemistry) and additional research groups. The departments are independently led by their directors.

Research 

The institute consists of five scientific departments and additional research groups.
 Atmospheric Chemistry Department: The Atmospheric Chemistry Department which is led by Prof. Dr. Jos Lelieveld focuses on the study of ozone and other atmospheric photo-oxidants, their chemical reactions and global cycles. The researchers use kinetic and photochemical laboratory investigations, in situ and remote sensing measurements. The Atmospheric Chemistry department also develops numerical models to describe meteorological and chemical processes in the atmosphere, to simulate the complex atmospheric interactions and to test the theory through measurement campaigns (ground-based or by ship, aircraft, satellite). Research groups:
Reactive Processes (John Crowley)
Optical Spectroscopy (Horst Fischer)
Radical Measurements (Hartwig Harder)
Organic Reactive Species (Jonathan Williams)
Research Group of Andrea Pozzer
 Biogeochemistry Department: The Department Biogeochemistry of Prof. Dr. Meinrat O. Andreae concentrates on the exchange and interactions of trace gases and aerosols between biosphere and atmosphere with a special focus on Amazon region. They use laboratory investigations, field measurements and numerical models to study this processes. Research topics are: exchange of chemically and climatically important trace gases between the soil/vegetation system and the atmosphere, formation of aerosol particles and their effects on climate, impact of vegetation fires on ecology and atmospheric pollution, and the changing global cycles of trace elements.
 Department of Climate Geochemistry: Prof. (ETHZ) Dr. Gerald H. Haug and his team explore the climate -ocean-atmosphere system on annual up to geological timescales. Of particular interest is the Cenozoic (the past 65 million years). They investigate the changes in internal feedback processes, e.g. interactions between ocean and atmosphere, oceanic heat transport or its nutrient status. Moreover, the scientists study the biogeochemical processes in the polar oceans and their role in regulating atmospheric  concentration between ice ages and warmer periods. Therefore, they examine geological archives such as sediments from the open ocean and speleothems. The department operates the Research sail yacht S/Y Eugen Seibold. Research groups:
Isotope Biogeochemistry (Stephen Galer)
Paleoclimate Research (Klaus P. Jochum)
Organic Isotope Geochemistry (Alfredo Martínez-García)
Geosientific databases (Bärbel Sarbas)
Micropaleontology (Ralf Schiebel)
Inorganic Gas Isotope Geochemistry (Hubert Vonhof)
 Multiphase Chemistry Department: The department of Prof. Dr. Ulrich Pöschl deals with multiphase processes at the molecular level and its impact on the macroscopic and global scale. Concerning the Earth System and climate research, they focus on biological and organic aerosols, aerosol-cloud interactions and atmospheric surface exchange processes whereas in the field of life and health sciences, the researchers study the change of protein macromolecules air pollution and how this affects allergic reactions and diseases. Research groups:
Biomolecular Analyses & Interactions (J. Fröhlich)
Organic Pollutants & Exposure (G. Lammel)
Inflammatory Processes (K. Lucas)
Aerosol analysis & Microscopy (C. Pöhlker)
Multiscale Interactions & Integration (U. Pöschl)
Aerosol, Cloud & Surface Interactions (H. Su)
Microbial Communities & Processes (B. Weber)
Multiphase Chemical Kinetics and Reaction Mechanisms (T. Berkemeier)
 Particle Chemistry Department: The department is led by Prof. Dr. Stephan Borrmann. Here they study the physical properties and chemical composition of atmospheric aerosol and cloud particles using laboratory experiments (e.g. in a vertical wind tunnel), measurements on ground and hill stations and on mobile measurement facilities (airplanes). Furthermore, extraterrestrial particles are being analyzed using isotopic measurements, such as presolar grains from meteorites and comets. Research groups:
Instrumental Aerosol Analytics (Frank Drewnick)
NAMIP - Nano- and Microparticle Research (Peter Hoppe)
Aerosol and Cloud Chemistry (Johannes Schneider)
Atmospheric Hydrometeors (Miklós Szakáll and Karoline Diehl)
Aerosol and Cloud Physics (Stefan Borrmann, Ralf Weigel and Jacob Fugal)
AEROTROP (Christiane Voigt)
 Further research groups: In December 2016 there were four additional research groups at the institute: The Minerva group led by Dr. Yafang Cheng. They deal with the interaction of aerosols and regional air quality. Dr. Mikhail Eremets studies mater at high pressures. Prof. Dr. Thomas Wagner and his Satellite Research Group of analyzes satellite data in order to draw conclusions about tropospheric and stratospheric trace gases. The group "Terrestrial Paleoclimates" which is led by Dr. Kathryn Fitzsimmons, uses loess in Eurasia as climate archives for information of past climates.
 In 2010 the Geochemistry department (which was led by Prof. Albrecht W. Hofmann) was closed and the scientific working groups were integrated into the Biogeochemistry department. This department conducted research on large-scale geological processes, such as the formation of continental and oceanic crusts, the chemical differentiation of the Earth's mantle and the circulation of present-day and former oceans. The scientists used mass spectrometric measurements of isotopic abundances to determine the absolute age of rocks. They also used isotopic abundances and trace element contents to determine the origin of volcanic lava from the Earth's mantle or crust and studies the long-term processes used by the Earth's mantle to recycle old crust.

History 

The institute was founded as Kaiser Wilhelm Institute for Chemistry in Berlin Dahlem in 1911. The founding director was Ernst Beckmann (1853-1923), who also directed the Department of Inorganic and Physical Chemistry. The Department of Organic Chemistry was led by Richard Willstatter (1872-1942), who won the Nobel Prize for Chemistry in 1915 for his work on plant pigments. The teamwork of Otto Hahn (1879-1968), Lise Meitner (1878-1968) and Fritz Straßmann (1902-1980) led to the discovery of nuclear fission in December 1938. Otto Hahn was director of the institute from 1928 to 1946. He received the Nobel Prize for Chemistry in 1944.

During the war, in 1944, the Institute building was severely damaged as a result of air raids, including a raid on 15 February targeted to disrupt work on the German nuclear weapons program.  Everything that hadn't been destroyed was then stored in a closed textile factory in Tailfingen, Württemberg (present-day Albstadt), where the institute continued the work it had started in Berlin for a time.

After World War II the institute moved to the campus of Johannes Gutenberg University of Mainz in 1949. In 1948 the Kaiser Wilhelm Society was restructured and renamed becoming the Max Planck Society, the institute was also renamed as the Max Planck Institute for Chemistry (1949). In order to adapt to changing scientific requirements, the institute's research activities changed several times over the years. When classic chemistry was practiced in the early years, it later focussed on Radiochemistry, Cosmochemistry, Nuclear Physics, and mass spectrometry. These days the Max Planck Institute for Chemistry focusses on an integral scientific understanding of chemical processes in the Earth System from molecular to global scales.

Nobel laureates of the institute 
 Richard Willstätter, director from 1912 until 1916. In 1915, he received the Nobel Prize for Chemistry for his research into plant dyes, primarily chlorophyll. He discovered, among other things, that the structure of green dye exhibits significant similarity to the structure of the red blood pigment hemoglobin.
 Otto Hahn, director of the department for radioactive research from 1912 until 1948, from 1928 until 1946 managing director of the institute. The joint research by Otto Hahn, Lise Meitner and Fritz Straßmann into transuranic elements led to the discovery of nuclear fission in 1938. In 1945, Otto Hahn received the Nobel Prize for this.
 Paul J. Crutzen, director of the Atmospheric Chemistry Department from 1980 until 2000, Nobel Prize for Chemistry 1995 for investigations on the formation and destruction of ozone in the atmosphere.

Staff 
At the beginning of 2014 about 300 people were employed at the institute, including 77 scientists, 122 junior scientists and 11 trainees (mechanical workshop and electronics).

Max Planck Graduate School (MPGS) 
The Max Planck Graduate School (MPGS) at MPI for Chemistry offers a PhD program in atmospheric chemistry and physics, environmental physics and geophysics. The program should enable the PhD students to widen their knowledge and skills beyond the research topic of the doctoral project by visiting different lectures, workshops, soft skill courses, an annual PhD Symposium and summer schools. It was established by the Max Planck Society in January 2003. The Graduate School is in close cooperation with the University of Mainz (Institute for Physics of the Atmosphere), the University of Heidelberg (Institute for Environmental Physics), University of Frankfurt (Institute for Atmospheric and Environmental Sciences).

Directors of the institute

Kaiser Wilhelm Institute for Chemistry 
 1912 Ernst Beckmann
 1912 - 1916 Richard Willstätter 
 1912 - 1948 Otto Hahn 
 1916 - 1926 Alfred Stock

Max Planck Institute for Chemistry 
 1949 - 1953 Fritz Straßmann 
 1941 - 1965 Josef Mattauch 
 1953 - 1958 Friedrich A. Paneth 
 1959 - 1978 Heinrich Hintenberger 
 1959 - 1978 Hermann Wäffler 
 1967 - 1996 Heinrich Wänke 
 1968 - 1979 Christian Junge 
 1978 - 1995 Friedrich Begemann 
 1980 - 2000 Paul J. Crutzen 
 1980 - 2007 Albrecht W. Hofmann 
 1987 Meinrat O. Andreae 
 1996 Günter W. Lugmair 
 2000 Johannes Lelieveld 
 2001 Stephan Borrmann
 2014 Ulrich Pöschl 
 2015 Gerald Haug (managing director since 2018)

Collaborative projects 
 The Earth System Research Partnership (ESRP) pools research excellence across disciplines to understand how the Earth functions as a complex system and to improve the predictability of the effects of human actions. It encompasses the Max-Planck-Institutes for Biogeochemistry in Jena, MPI for Chemistry in Mainz and MPI for Meteorology in Hamburg. Over the last century, marked changes in climate, air quality, biodiversity, and water availability occurred. More and potentially more rapid changes are predicted. To find solutions to the challenges these changes pose, the ESRP studies the complex interactions and feedbacks of land, ocean, atmosphere, biosphere and humans in the field, the lab and through models. 
 ATTO: "ATTO" stands for Amazonian Tall Tower Observatory. The German-Brazilian joint project was launched in 2009 and is coordinated by the Max Planck Institute for Chemistry. The tower aims at delivering groundbreaking findings which will be the basis for improved climate models. With a height of 300 meters the tower will extend the ground-level boundary layer, and will provide information taken from approximately 100 squarekilometers from the world's largest forest area. ATTO is the counterpart of the 2006 completed ZOTTO tower that stands in Siberia and the Max Planck Institute of Chemistry is also involved. ATTO will integrated into an existing structure of smaller Brazilian measuring towers. The cost for the construction of ATTO including the first five years of running costs is estimated to be 8.4 million €. which will be financed by Germany and Brazil in equal parts.
 HALO: HALO - The High Altitude and LOng Range Research Aircraft is a Research Aircraft for atmospheric research and earth observation of the German Science Community. HALO is funded by the Federal Ministry of Education and Research, the Helmholtz-Gemeinschaft and the Max-Planck-Gesellschaft. 
 IBBI: Interdisciplinary Biomass Burning Initiative (IBBI)
 CARIBIC: Global Atmospheric Composition and Climate Change Research EUROPE's SOLUTION FOR GLOBAL ATMOSPHERE MONITORING. CARIBIC is an innovative scientific project to study and monitor important chemical and physical processes in the Earth's atmosphere. Detailed and extensive measurements are made during long-distance flights. Since October 2015 the CARIBIC project has moved to the Karlsruhe Institute of Technology and the Institute of Meteorology and Climate Research - Atmospheric Trace Gases and Remote Sensing.

Databases 
The institute provides four databases which give information about 1) reference materials of geological and environmental interest (GeoReM), 2) volcanic rocks and mantle xenoliths (GEOROC), 3) UV/VIS absorption cross sections, and 4) Henry's law constants.

References

External links 
 Homepage of the Max Planck Institute for Chemistry
 Homepage of the Max Planck Society

Chemistry
Chemical research institutes
1911 establishments in Germany